The Battle of Mal Tiempo was a battle of the Cuban War of Independence that took place on December 15, 1895, a few kilometers away from Cruces, Santa Clara Province. In the battle, Mambises and Spanish forces faced each other, the former being victorious. This victory was considered one of the most important of the Invasion from East to West in Cuba, due to the political, military and economic consequences in favor of the independence activists.

Background
The battle would be classified as one of the most illustrious events in the struggles for Cuban independence. It was led by Generalissimo Máximo Gómez and his Lieutenant General Antonio Maceo, who led a troop of courageous patriots who carried out events that ennobled the country's history in decisive battles for the prestige of the armed insurrection. In his march from the East, Arsenio Martínez Campos, a key figure within the Spanish colonial system on the island, understood that the advance of the Liberation Army was imminent and in a desperate attempt to stop the insurrectionary thrust, he concentrated a large number of troops in the Cruces area.

The battle
The Mal Tiempo area was the setting that allowed Cubans to demonstrate the patriotism that fueled them. The Mambi insurgents also had the topography of the land, "a gift of nature to make victory more perfect." The tactical intelligence of the Generalissimo, Máximo Gómez, and the bravery of his men, provided the rest for the success of the contest. Maceo was at the forefront of the cavalry, and Gómez attacked shouting: To combat, long live free Cuba! and as soon as he said that, fighting broke out.

Eugenio Sánchez Agramonte, who was present during the battle reportedly said:

José Miró Argenter who was another witness during the battle noted that

He followed that up with:

Enrique Loynaz del Castillo who was a participant, highlighted that:

Aftermath
During the battle, the Liberation Army caused around 300 casualties to the Spanish army. The independence forces only reported four deaths and the same number of wounded. The accurate military strategy of Generalissimo Gómez and the bravery and combative disposition of his soldiers were tested.

Many Cubans linked to the sugar industry, inspired by the triumph of Mal Tiempo, suspended the work of preparing the harvest and dismantled the machines of the sugar mills. The Cubans also sieged equipment from the Spanish such as weapons, ammunition, mules and horses. This fact constituted a severe economic blow for the Spanish colonialists of the region. In days after December 15, the Spanish Army suffered another series of defeats caused by the Creole insurgents, although the battle of Mal Tiempo was essential for the advance of the invasion towards the West of the island of Cuba.

References

Further reading
Battle of Mal Tiempo, a military milestone in Cuba
Batalla de mal tiempo: una luz en la historia de cruces battle of...

Conflicts in 1895
Battles involving Spain
Spanish colonial period of Cuba
December 1895 events
Battles involving Cuba